Parnthep V.K.Khaoyai, formerly Samuenthep Por.Petchsiri (เสมือนเทพ ป.เพชรศิริ) is a Thai Muay Thai fighter.

Titles and accomplishments
Lumpinee Stadium
 2018 Lumpinee Stadium 105 lbs Champion
 2019 Lumpinee Stadium 112 lbs Champion
Channel 7 Stadium
 2022 Channel 7 Stadium 122 lbs Champion

Fight record

|-  style="background:#cfc;"
| 2023-01-28|| Win ||align=left| Long Unchoeut || LWC Super Champ, Lumpinee Stadium || Bangkok, Thailand || KO ||4 ||  

|-  style="background:#fbb;"
| 2023-01-07 || Loss ||align=left| Petchsamarn Sor.Samarngarment || Chang MuayThai Kiatpetch Amarin Super Fight, World Siam Stadium|| Bangkok, Thailand || Decision||  5||  3:00
|-
|-  style="background:#cfc"
| 2022-11-26 || Win ||align=left| Panpetch Liemthanawat || TorNamThai Kiatpetch TKO, World Siam Stadium || Bangkok, Thailand || KO (Elbow)|| 4 || 

|-  style="background:#cfc"
| 2022-08-27 || Win||align=left| Comeback TK.Yuttana || Kiatpetch TKO, World Siam Stadium || Bangkok, Thailand || TKO || 4 || 
|-
|-  style="background:#fbb"
| 2022-07-11 || Loss ||align=left| Surachai Sor.Sommai || New Power Muaythai, Dhupatemiya Stadium || Songkhla province, Thailand || Decision|| 5 ||3:00 
|-
|-
|-  style="background:#cfc;"
| 2022-05-08 || Win ||align=left| Petchsamarn Sor.Samarngarment || Channel 7 Stadium || Bangkok, Thailand ||Decision || 5 ||3:00  
|-
! style=background:white colspan=9 |
|-  style="background:#cfc;"
| 2022-04-03||Win ||align=left| Petchsaensaeb SorJor.TongPrachin || Chang Muaythai Kiatpetch Amarin, Rajadamnern Stadium || Bangkok, Thailand || Decision || 5 || 3:00 
|-  style="background:#cfc;"
| 2022-02-20||Win ||align=left| Petchmaeprik Fordpayakdannuea || Chang Muaythai Kiatpetch Amarin, Rajadamnern Stadium || Bangkok, Thailand || KO || 4 || 
|-  style="background:#fbb;"
| 2021-11-20|| Loss ||align=left| Superlek Jitmuangnon || Omnoi Stadium || Samut Sakhon, Thailand || Decision || 5 || 3:00
|-
! style=background:white colspan=9 |
|-  style="background:#cfc;"
| 2021-03-26|| Win||align=left| Parnpetch Sor.Jor.Lekmuangnon || Suk Kiatpetch Super Fight, Lumpinee Stadium || Bangkok, Thailand ||Decision ||5  ||3:00
|-  style="background:#c5d2ea;"
| 2020-12-18 || Draw ||align=left| Kiew Parunchai || Suk Singmawin || Songkhla, Thailand||Decision || 5 || 3:00
|-  style="background:#cfc;"
| 2020-10-21|| Win||align=left| Mohawk Tded99 || Petchwittaya, Rajadamnern Stadium || Bangkok, Thailand ||KO ||2  ||
|-  style="background:#fbb;"
| 2020-08-14|| Loss||align=left| Phetanuwat Nor.Anuwatgym || Muaymanwansuk, Rangsit Stadium || Rangsit, Thailand ||Decision ||5  ||3:00
|-  style="background:#cfc;"
| 2020-01-14|| Win||align=left| Yod Parunchai || Petchkiatpetch, Lumpinee Stadium || Bangkok, Thailand ||Decision ||5  ||3:00
|-
! style=background:white colspan=9 |
|-  style="background:#cfc;"
| 2019-12-18|| Win||align=left| Petchzeeta GobWasaduPanPhuketMuayThai || Singmawin, Rajadamnern Stadium || Bangkok, Thailand ||Decision ||5  ||3:00
|-  style="background:#fbb;"
| 2019-11-05|| Loss||align=left| Wanchainoi Sitsarawatseur || Kiatpetch, Lumpinee Stadium || Bangkok, Thailand ||KO ||3  ||
|-  style="background:#cfc;"
| 2019-09-24|| Win||align=left| Nuapetch KelaSport || Petchnumnoi + Prestige Fight, Lumpinee Stadium || Bangkok, Thailand ||KO (Knee to the Body) ||4  ||
|-
! style=background:white colspan=9 |
|-  style="background:#c5d2ea;"
| 2019-07-23|| Draw||align=left| Petchrungruang Odtuekdaeng || Muay Thai 1T, Lumpinee Stadium || Bangkok, Thailand ||Decision ||5  ||3:00
|-  style="background:#cfc;"
| 2019-06-11|| Win||align=left| Petchmuangpan Bamrungsit || Sangmorakot, Lumpinee Stadium || Bangkok, Thailand ||KO ||3  ||
|-  style="background:#fbb;"
| 2019-04-30|| Loss ||align=left| Petchrungruang Odtuekdaeng || Petchnumnoi + Prestige Fight, Lumpinee Stadium || Bangkok, Thailand ||Decision ||5  ||3:00
|-  style="background:#fbb;"
| 2019-03-22|| Loss ||align=left| Petchanuwat Nor.AnuwatGym || Muaymanwansuk + Petchnumnoi, Lumpinee Stadium || Bangkok, Thailand ||KO ||3  ||
|-  style="background:#cfc;"
| 2019-01-22|| Win||align=left| Petchrungruang Odtuekdaeng || PK.Saenchai, Lumpinee Stadium || Bangkok, Thailand ||Decision ||5  ||3:00
|-  style="background:#cfc;"
| 2018-12-25|| Win||align=left| Petchrungruang Odtuekdaeng || Petchnumnoi, Lumpinee Stadium || Bangkok, Thailand ||Decision ||5  ||3:00
|-  style="background:#cfc;"
| 2018-11-30|| Win||align=left| Ittipon Singmawin || Petchnumnoi, Lumpinee Stadium || Bangkok, Thailand ||Decision ||5  ||3:00
|-
! style=background:white colspan=9 |
|-  style="background:#fbb;"
| 2018-10-25|| Loss ||align=left| Petchanuwat Nor.AnuwatGym || Petchyindee, Rajadamnern Stadium || Bangkok, Thailand ||Decision || 5 || 3:00
|-  style="background:#cfc;"
| 2018-09-25|| Win||align=left| Chaiyo Petchyindee || Petchnumnoi, Lumpinee Stadium || Bangkok, Thailand ||Decision ||5  ||3:00
|-  style="background:#cfc;"
| 2018-08-28|| Win||align=left| Malaithong Chor.Ruangam || Petchnumnoi + Street Fight, Lumpinee Stadium || Bangkok, Thailand ||Decision ||5  ||3:00
|-  style="background:#fbb;"
| 2018-06-05|| Loss||align=left| Hercules Phetsimean ||Lumpinee champion Kruekrai, Lumpinee Stadium || Bangkok, Thailand ||Decision ||5  ||3:00
|-
! style=background:white colspan=9 |
|-  style="background:#fbb;"
| 2018-05-02|| Loss||align=left| Hercules Phetsimean || Petchwittaya, Rajadamnern Stadium || Bangkok, Thailand || Decision ||5  ||3:00
|-  style="background:#cfc;"
| 2018-03-27|| Win ||align=left| Chalaamkow Tor.Morsi || Kiatpetch, Lumpinee Stadium || Bangkok, Thailand || Decision ||5  ||3:00
|-  style="background:#cfc;"
| 2017-12-26|| Win ||align=left| Kompayak Sor.Jor.Vichitpaedriw || Petchnumnoi, Lumpinee Stadium || Bangkok, Thailand || KO ||3  ||
|-  style="background:#cfc;"
| 2017-11-10|| Win ||align=left| Tabtimthong SorJor.Lekmuangnon || Petchnumnoi, Lumpinee Stadium || Bangkok, Thailand || Decision ||5  ||3:00
|-  style="background:#cfc;"
| 2017-09-08|| Win ||align=left| Petchbanrai Singmawin || Kiatpetch + OneParunchai, Lumpinee Stadium || Bangkok, Thailand || Decision ||5  ||3:00
|-  style="background:#cfc;"
| 2017-07-20|| Win ||align=left| Petchbanrai Singmawin || Lumpinee Stadium || Bangkok, Thailand || Decision ||5  ||3:00
|-  style="background:#cfc;"
| 2017-05-16|| Win ||align=left| PhetAek FighterMuayThai || Lumpinee Stadium || Bangkok, Thailand || Decision ||5  ||3:00
|-  style="background:#c5d2ea;"
| 2017-03-31|| Draw||align=left| Petchbanrai Singmawin || Lumpinee Stadium || Bangkok, Thailand || Decision ||5  ||3:00
|-  style="background:#cfc;"
| 2017-03-07|| Win ||align=left| Yodsing Singmawin || Lumpinee Stadium || Bangkok, Thailand || Decision ||5  ||3:00
|-  style="background:#cfc;"
| 2017-02-12|| Win ||align=left| Phetrung Sor.Jor.Lekmuangnon || Jitmuangnon Stadium || Bangkok, Thailand || Decision ||5  ||3:00
|-
| colspan=9 | Legend:

References

Parnthep V.K.Khaoyai
Living people
2001 births
Parnthep V.K.Khaoyai